David Litt (born September 17, 1986) is an American political speechwriter and author of the comedic memoir Thanks, Obama: My Hopey Changey White House Years.  He is currently the head writer/producer for Funny or Die's office in Washington, D.C.

Biography
Born to a Jewish family in New York City where he attended the Dalton School, Litt attended Yale University, where he was a member of the Yale Ex!t Players and editor-in-chief of the Yale Record. He first got involved in political speechwriting through an internship with West Wing Writers. He entered the White House in 2011, at the age of 24, and for four years served as a senior presidential speechwriter first to Presidential Advisor Valerie Jarrett, White House Chief of Staff William M. Daley, and ultimately to President Barack Obama, including as the lead writer on four White House Correspondents' Association dinner presentations. Litt has also written for The Onion and McSweeney's Internet Tendency.

Litt married Jacqueline Kappler on August 4, 2018.

Books
Litt's first book, Thanks, Obama, was a New York Times Best Seller and was named one of the best books of 2017 by Esquire magazine. His second, Democracy in One Book or Less, was released in June 2020.

Bibliography
 Thanks, Obama: My Hopey, Changey White House Years (Ecco Press) 
 Democracy in One Book or Less (Ecco Press)

References

Living people
Obama administration personnel
American speechwriters
American Jews
Writers from New York City
Dalton School alumni
Exit Players alumni
Yale University alumni
1986 births